Lotte Kopecky (born 10 November 1995) is a Belgian road and track racing cyclist, who rides for UCI Women's WorldTeam . She is a multiple world champion on the track, having won four gold medals across three UCI Track Cycling World Championships; she won the madison in 2017 and 2022, the points race in 2021 and the elimination race in 2022. She participated in the 2020 Summer Olympics in Tokyo, finishing 4th in the individual road race. In 2022, she won the Strade Bianche and Tour of Flanders classics.

Career achievements

Major results

Road
Source:

2010
 1st  Time trial, National Novice Championships
 1st Time trial, Antwerp Provincial Novice Championships
2011
 1st  Time trial, National Novice Championships
 1st Time trial, Antwerp Provincial Novice Championships
2012
 National Junior Championships
1st  Time trial
2nd Road race
 UEC European Junior Championships
3rd  Time trial
5th Road race
2013
 2nd Time trial, National Junior Championships
 2nd Time trial, Antwerp Provincial Junior Championships
 3rd Road race, Flanders Regional Junior Championships
 UEC European Junior Championships
7th Time trial
9th Road race
 8th Overall Junior Energiewacht Tour
1st  Sprints classification
2014
 National Championships
1st  Under-23 road race
1st  Under-23 time trial
2nd Road race
 1st 's Gravenwezel
 3rd Kieldrecht–Prosperpolder
 10th Diamond Tour
2015
 National Championships
1st  Under-23 road race
2nd Road race
 Antwerp Provincial Championships
1st Time trial
1st Road race
 1st Herselt Koerse – Zuidkempense Ladies Classic
 2nd Trofee Maarten Wynants
 3rd Grote Prijs De Wielkeszuigers
 5th Grand Prix de Dottignies
 6th Dwars door Vlaanderen
2016
 National Under-23 Championships
1st  Road race
1st  Time trial
 1st Trofee Maarten Wynants
 National Championships
2nd Road race
2nd Time trial
 2nd Gooik–Geraardsbergen–Gooik
 4th Overall Belgium Tour
1st  Young rider classification
 6th Diamond Tour
 8th Ljubljana–Domžale–Ljubljana TT
 9th La Course by Le Tour de France
 10th Gran Premio Bruno Beghelli
2017
 National Under-23 Championships
1st  Road race
1st  Time trial
 2nd Road race, National Championships
 2nd Acht van Westerveld
 5th Omloop van het Hageland
 5th Tour of Flanders
 5th Dwars door de Westhoek
 6th Dwars door Vlaanderen
 8th Overall Belgium Tour
 9th Trofee Maarten Wynants
2018
 2nd Time trial, National Championships
 3rd Overall Belgium Tour
1st  Points classification
1st  Belgian rider classification
1st Stage 1
 4th Veenendaal–Veenendaal Classic
 5th Diamond Tour
 7th Dwars door de Westhoek
2019
 1st  Time trial, National Championships
 1st Vuelta a la Comunitat Valenciana
 1st MerXem Classic
 2nd Overall Belgium Tour
 3rd Overall Tour of Chongming Island
 3rd Nokere Koerse
 3rd Three Days of Bruges–De Panne
 3rd Dwars door de Westhoek
 3rd Diamond Tour
 4th RideLondon Classique
 5th Ronde van Drenthe
 6th Gent–Wevelgem
 9th Le Samyn
2020
 National Championships
1st  Road race
1st  Time trial
 1st Stage 7 Giro Rosa
 2nd Gent–Wevelgem
 3rd Le Samyn
 3rd Tour of Flanders
 3rd Three Days of Bruges–De Panne
 4th Brabantse Pijl Dames Gooik
 7th Road race, UEC European Championships
2021
 National Championships
1st  Road race
1st  Time trial
 1st  Overall Belgium Tour
1st  Points classification
1st Stage 3
 1st Le Samyn
 Challenge by La Vuelta
1st  Points classification
1st Stage 4
 2nd Overall Thüringen Ladies Tour
1st  Sprints classification
1st Stage 4
 2nd Gent–Wevelgem
 4th Road race, Summer Olympics
 4th Omloop Het Nieuwsblad
 4th Nokere Koerse
 4th Classic Brugge–De Panne
 4th Dwars door het Hageland
 7th La Classique Morbihan
2022
 1st  Time trial, National Championships
 1st Tour of Flanders
 1st Strade Bianche
 Vuelta a Burgos
1st  Points classification
1st Stage 1
 UCI World Championships
2nd  Road race
9th Time trial
 2nd Paris–Roubaix
 2nd Nokere Koerse
 3rd Ronde van Drenthe
 4th Overall RideLondon Classique
 4th Gent–Wevelgem
 9th Classic Brugge–De Panne
2023
 1st Omloop Het Nieuwsblad
 1st Nokere Koerse
 2nd Strade Bianche

Classics results timeline

Major championship results timeline

Track

2010
 National Novice Championships
1st  Individual pursuit
2nd Team pursuit
3rd Omnium
3rd Scratch
2011
 National Novice Championships
2nd Team sprint
3rd Team pursuit
3rd Keirin
3rd Individual pursuit
2012
 National Junior Championships
2nd Individual pursuit
2nd Team pursuit
3rd Points race
3rd Keirin
2013
 UEC European Junior Championships
1st  Points race
1st  Individual pursuit
3rd  Team pursuit
 National Junior Championships
2nd Omnium
2nd Team pursuit
3rd Points race
2014
 National Championships
1st  Individual pursuit
3rd 500m time trial
3rd Keirin
3rd Points race
 3 Jours d'Aigle
1st Individual pursuit
1st Scratch
2nd Points race
 Belgian Xmas Meetings 
1st Individual pursuit
2nd Points race
2nd Scratch
 3rd  Individual pursuit, UEC European Under-23 Championships
 3rd Scratch, Open des Nations sur Piste de Roubaix
 3rd Individual pursuit, International Belgian Open
2015
 National Championships
1st  Individual pursuit
2nd Scratch
2nd Omnium
2nd Points race
 3 Jours d'Aigle
1st Individual pursuit
2nd Scratch
 2nd  Scratch, 2015–16 UCI Track Cycling World Cup, Cali
2016
 UEC European Championships
1st  Madison (with Jolien D'Hoore)
3rd  Omnium
 UEC European Under-23 Championships
1st  Points
1st  Omnium
 National Championships
1st  Omnium
2nd Scratch
2nd Individual pursuit
2nd Points
 1st Omnium, Six Days of Ghent
 Grand Prix of Poland
1st Points
3rd Team pursuit
 2nd  Omnium, 2016–17 UCI Track Cycling World Cup, Glasgow
 Revolution Series, Glasgow
2nd Scratch
3rd Points
2017
 1st  Madison, UCI World Championships (with Jolien D'Hoore)
 2016–17 UCI Track Cycling World Cup
1st  Overall, Omnium
1st  Omnium, Cali
2nd Overall, Points race
 2017–18 UCI Track Cycling World Cup
1st  Points race, Pruszków
1st  Madison, Pruszków
2nd  Madison, Manchester
 National Championships
1st  Omnium
1st  Points race
1st  Scratch
 Belgian International Track Meeting
1st Madison
3rd Omnium
 Zesdaagse Vlaanderen-Gent
2nd Madison
3rd Omnium
2018
 International Belgian Track Meeting
1st Madison
1st Omnium
 Madison, 2018–19 UCI Track Cycling World Cup
3rd  Berlin
3rd  London
2019
 Madison, 2018–19 UCI Track Cycling World Cup
1st  Cambridge
2nd  Hong Kong
2021
 UCI World Championships
1st  Points race
2nd  Elimination
2nd  Omnium
2022
 UCI World Championships
1st  Madison (with Shari Bossuyt)
1st  Elimination
 UEC European Championships
1st  Elimination
1st  Points race
2023
 National Championships
1st  Individual pursuit
1st  Points race
1st  Omnium
1st  Elimination
1st  Madison (with Shari Bossuyt)
 UEC European Championships
1st  Elimination
3rd  Omnium

Cyclo-cross

2020–2021
 2nd National Championships

Honours and awards
 Belgian Promising Talent of the Year: 2017
 Flandrienne of the Year: 2020, 2021, 2022
 Crystal Bicycle: 2020, 2021, 2022
 Trophy Patrick Sercu: 2022

References

External links
 
 
 
 
 
 
 
 

1995 births
Living people
Belgian female cyclists
People from Rumst
Cyclists at the 2016 Summer Olympics
Cyclists at the 2020 Summer Olympics
Olympic cyclists of Belgium
Cyclists from Antwerp Province
UCI Track Cycling World Champions (women)
Belgian track cyclists
21st-century Belgian women